Our Lady Of The Most Holy Rosary Parish, Billingham has been recently combined with two other parishes to create a new parish St. Thomas of Canterbury Billingha. so technically no longer exists. The new and old parishes are both located in the Roman Catholic Diocese of Hexham and Newcastle, and serve the town's Catholic community. The parish is served by the Parish Priest Rev J Butters and the Deacon Rev D McKie.

History
Holy Rosary parish was established on 13 November 1949 and almost immediately a temporary church, known as "The Hut" was built, it was blessed in 1950. Soon funds became available to build a permanent church within the parish and Bishop James Cunningham laid the foundation stone on 16 May 1959. The church was opened on 22 September 1960. The church sanctuary was re-ordered in 1977, a permanent stone altar was brought forward, later the altar rails were removed and in 1984 a lectern and baptismal font were installed. In 1985 the parish celebrated the Silver Jubilee of the church building with week-long celebrations. The parish celebrated its Golden Jubilee in 1999. In 2009 the parish celebrated its Diamond Jubilee, with a Mass celebrated by the Bishop of Hexham & Newcastle Rt Rev. Seamus Cunningham.

Position, Structure & Hierarchy
The parish, now known as St. Thomas of Canterbury is led by Rev J Butters. It is in the Deanery of St. Peter (the 18th Deanery ) which comprises Stockton-on-Tees & Billingham, whose Dean is Rev. P McKenna. St. Peter's Deanery lies within the Episcopal Area of Cleveland & South Durham, whose Episcopal Vicar is Rev J Butters.

Service Times

Confessions with Exposition of the Blessed of Sacrament Fridays 6-7pm.

Statistics
Mass Attendance (as of 2008) 295, Number of Baptisms (2008) 11, Number of Marriages (2008) 1, Deaths (2008) 21.

References

External links
Parish website
Diocese Website page on parish

Billingham